The 1931 Kent State Golden Flashes football team was an American football team that represented Kent State College (later renamed Kent State University) during the 1931 college football season. In its seventh season under head coach Merle E. Wagoner, Kent State compiled a 3–4 record and was outscored by a total of 80 to 58.

Schedule

References

Kent State
Kent State Golden Flashes football seasons
Kent State Golden Flashes football